The Philippine province of Ifugao has 176 barangays comprising its 11 municipalities.

Barangays

References

Ifugao
Populated places in Ifugao